The 2013–14 Savannah State Tigers basketball team represented Savannah State University during the 2013–14 NCAA Division I men's basketball season. The Tigers, led by ninth year head coach Horace Broadnax, played their home games at Tiger Arena and were members of the Mid-Eastern Athletic Conference. They finished the season 13–19, 10–6 in MEAC play to finish in fifth place. They advanced to the quarterfinals of the MEAC tournament where they lost to Norfolk State.

In 2019, all 13 wins were vacated due to academic certification errors.

Roster

Schedule

|-
!colspan=9 style="background:#CC5500; color:#002395;"| Exhibition

|-
!colspan=9 style="background:#CC5500; color:#002395;"| Regular season

|-
!colspan=9 style="background:#CC5500; color:#002395;"| MEAC tournament

References

Savannah State Tigers basketball seasons
Savannah State
Savannah State Tigers basketball team
Savannah State Tigers basketball team